United Nations Security Council Resolution 366 was adopted unanimously on December 17, 1974, after its previous resolutions and General Assembly Resolution 2145 which terminated South Africa's Mandate over Namibia. The Security Council was concerned with South Africa's continued occupation of the territory and its brutal repression of its people.

The Council condemned South Africa's continued occupation of the land and its illegal application of South African discriminatory laws in Namibia and demanded that South Africa make some declaration that it would comply with international law.  The Resolution demanded that South Africa make the necessary steps to effect the withdrawal and release political prisoners from Namibia as well as abolishing the application of racially discriminatory laws and practices.

See also
 History of Namibia
 List of United Nations Security Council Resolutions 301 to 400 (1971–1976)
 Namibia – South Africa relations
 South West Africa

References

Text of the Resolution at undocs.org

External links
 

 0366
 0366
 0366
December 1974 events